Frosted glass is produced by the sandblasting or acid etching of clear sheet glass. This creates a pitted surface on one side of the glass pane and has the effect of rendering the glass translucent by scattering the light which passes through, thus blurring images while still transmitting light. It has 10-20% Opacity.

Applications:

 To achieve visual privacy while still allowing light to pass through.
 Decorative patterns may be created on plain glass by using wax or other inhibitors to retain transparent areas. 
 To distribute light uniformly in a photographic contact printer.
 To create an airtight seal in tubes.

The frosted glass effect can also be achieved by the application of vinyl film, used as a sort of stencil on the glass surface. "Photo-resist", or photo-resistant film is also available, which can be produced to mask off the area surrounding a decorative design, or logo on the glass surface. A similar effect may also be accomplished with the use of canned frosted glass sprays.

Recycling issue 

Frosted glass is not suitable for recycling through glass bins.

See also
 Ground glass
 Ground glass joint

References

Glass coating and surface modification
Glass types